The 1993 Alaska Milkmen season was the eighth season of the franchise in the Philippine Basketball Association (PBA).

Draft picks

Summary
Alaska lost their first game of the season to Swift, but got an impressive showing from promising rookies Johnny Abarrientos and Johnedel Cardel. The Milkmen had an even 4-4 won-loss card when they were beaten by Sta.Lucia and ousted from the next round by Swift in the All-Filipino Cup.  It was the third straight time the Milkmen failed to make past the eliminations.
 
Their import from last season, Winston Crite, declined to return and Alaska had to settle for Kenny Battle, a first round pick of the Detroit Pistons in 1989 and had stops with four NBA teams, as their import for the Commissioner’s Cup. Battle led Alaska all the way into the last day of the semifinal round on August 22 when the Milkmen were locked in a four-way race in a playoff for the second finals berth along with Shell, San Miguel and Purefoods. All four teams carry a 10-8 won-loss card. Alaska lost to Purefoods Oodles, 80-105, in their do-or-die game.

Resident import Sean Chambers played three games for Alaska in the Governor's Cup, leading the Milkmen to an opening day 102-98 win against Ginebra on September 26.  The Milkmen lost their next two games and Chambers, hurting on his foot, temporarily given his spot to his recommended Rodney Fuller, who was below six feet and was replaced by Rodney Monroe after four games. Monroe played one game in Alaska's 87-91 loss to Purefoods in Iloilo City on October 23 and a contract dispute led to Monroe leaving. Sean Chambers was back from the injured list and scored a career-high 63 points upon his return as Alaska defeated Ginebra, 130-117 on October 26. The Milkmen were eliminated from the semifinal round when they lost to Swift, 97-100, in their last game on November 2.

Roster

Transactions

Trades

Additions

Subtractions

Recruited imports

References

Alaska Aces (PBA) seasons
Alaska